Kanapathy Moorthy (23 December 1932 – 11 August 2010) was a Malaysian judoka. He competed in the men's middleweight event at the 1964 Summer Olympics.

References

1932 births
2010 deaths
Malaysian male judoka
Olympic judoka of Malaysia
Malaysian people of Indian descent
Malaysian Hindus
Judoka at the 1964 Summer Olympics
Sportspeople from Kuala Lumpur